The 2008 Henderson Formula Palmer Audi motor-racing competition was the eleventh of its kind. It was contested over 20 races at eight circuits in the United Kingdom and Belgium between April and September. The overall winner was Jason Moore.

Championship

The 2008 Formula Palmer Audi Championship was very competitive, with seven winners through the season and a three-way championship battle going into the final round.

Jason Moore emerged as champion, but he was under intense pressure through much of the season from Tom Bradshaw and Jolyon Palmer. Moore made the best start to the season, winning three of the opening five races, with Richard Plant picking up a win in Round Two and Tom Bradshaw winning at Brands Hatch in Round Five. Moore also won in a triple-header at Spa-Francorchamps, although Jolyon Palmer scored an excellent victory in Round Six. Jack Clarke also scored a win in Round 10 at Oulton Park.

In the second half of the season Tom Bradshaw achieved four race wins, including a treble at Snetterton. Elsewhere Richard Keen made a superb albeit brief appearance in the championship, gaining two victories and one pole in three races.

In total there were 33 entrants. There were 20 rounds across eight race events, one of which took place out of the UK, at Spa-Francorchamps. The championship continued to support large international events at Brands Hatch such as A1 Grand Prix, the World Touring Car Championship and DTM.

Championship standings

Race calendar

References

Formula Palmer Audi
Formula Palmer Audi seasons
Palmer Audi